Alejandro Végh Villegas (17 October 1928 – 13 March 2017) was a Uruguayan politician.

Background
Villegas was born in Brussels. His great-grandfather Sándor Végh was a Hungarian military officer who migrated to Uruguay in the mid-19th century. And his mother was a great-grandchild of President Joaquín Suárez.

He has been a prominent business leader in Uruguay. His father, Carlos Végh Garzón, was Economy Minister in 1967.

Public offices
He served as Minister of Economy and Finance of Uruguay from 1974 to 1976 and again from 1983 to 1985.

In between these periods of office, he also served as Uruguayan Ambassador to the United States from 1982 to 1983.

Personal life
He was married to Suzanne Gramont in 1954.  His only son, Carlos A. Vegh, was born in 1958, and is an academic economist.

See also
 Politics of Uruguay
 List of political families#Uruguay

References

1928 births
2017 deaths
Uruguayan people of Hungarian descent
Uruguayan people of Spanish descent
Ministers of Economics and Finance of Uruguay
Politicians from Brussels
Ambassadors of Uruguay to the United States
Uruguayan industrial engineers
Uruguayan economists
University of the Republic (Uruguay) alumni
Harvard University alumni
Directors of the Office of Planning and Budgeting of Uruguay